The following is a list of the television networks and announcers who have broadcast the college football's Big 12 Championship Game throughout the years.

Television

2020s

2010s

2000s

1990s

Radio

2020s

2010s

2000s

Statistics

References

External links
Big 12 Championship Game down 19%. 

ABC Sports
Lists of college football broadcasters
Broadcasters
College football on the radio
ESPN Radio
Fox Sports announcers
Sports USA Radio Network